Squirrel and Hedgehog is a North Korean animated series made by SEK Studio. Squirrel and Hedgehog is one of the most popular animated series in North Korea. The show was supposedly discontinued in 2013, which was around the time North Korean state television changed its broadcasting schedule, which cut several animated programs along with it.

The first episode of the show, produced in 1977, is based on a short novel published in a North Korean children's magazine in the 1970s. The short film was so popular with the public that the crew decided to turn the show into a series. In 2006, the producers said the show would be in production until episode 52, but was discontinued in 2012 for unknown reasons.

Characters and Locations

Flower Hill 
The main character's hometown. Squirrels, hedgehogs, ducks, rabbits and small animals live in this village.
 Kŭmsaegi (금색이/Gold Squirrel, Code name "Pang-ul-ggot") - The main character of the series. He is agile, brave, and has a great intellect.
 Juldarami (줄다람이/Striped Squirrel) - He is a scout from Flower Hill and a partner of Geumsaegi. He trusts and loves Geumsaegi and is willing to give everything for him. He shows strong loyalty and friendship towards Geumsaegi to the point of saying "I will give my life for him". Their relationship turned into 'twin brothers' in the international dub.
 Pamsaegi (밤색이/Brownie, Brown Squirrel) - Younger brother of Geumsaegi. A new character of the second series. He used to be Dr. Mole's assistant, but becomes a scout following his brother.
 Scout Kosŭmdochi (고슴도치 정찰병/Scout Hedgehog)
 Scout Mulangae (물안개)
 Undochi (은도치) - Younger brother of Goseumdochi. A new character of the second series. He wants to be a great scout following Geumsaegi and his older brother.
 Gomajeossi (곰 아저씨/Uncle Bear) – A blustering friend of the village who promises but fails to protect it.

Weasel Empire 
 Captain Weasel (족제비 대장/General Commander)
 Mulmangcho (물망초/Forget-me-not/Buttercup (in Sienduk's translation)) - He is the main villain of the series. he wears glasses. He is one of the few characters who knows that Geumsaegi is a flower hill spy.
 One-Eared (외귀팔이) - He is a mouse following Mulmangcho. He lost one ear.
 Black Weasel (검은 족제비)
 One-Eyed Weasel (애꾸 특무대장, 돌산 참모장/Scout Commander)
 Dr. White Weasel (흰 족제비 박사)

Wolves' Den 
 Captain Wolf/Keoteo (승냥이 대장) - He is the captain of the wolf army. He has blue glowing eyes.
 Assistant Weasel (족제비 보좌관) - A younger brother of Captain Weasel.
 Assistant Fox/Lt. Fox Vixen (여우 장교)

Other villages 

 Rabbit Village
 Grey Squirrel Village

Voice cast

 Geumsaegi: Unknown (episode 1, 2~4) → Won Jong-Suk (episode 5~31) → Heo Kyong-Hui (episode 32)
 Juldarami: Unknown (episode 4) → Kim Tae-Ryon (episode 10~13, 17) → Won Jong-Suk (episode 14, 15) → Rim Bok-Hui (episode 19~)
 Bamsaegi: Rim Un-Yong
 Scout Goseumdochi: Unknown (episode 1~4) → Kwon Nyong-Ju
 Undochi: Lee Eun-Ju (episode 27) → Choe Hyon-Ha
 Dr. Mole: Kim Tae-Hong
 Captain Weasel: Unknown (episode 1~4) → Kim Tae-Hong
 Mulmangcho: Unknown (episode 7~11) → Kim Thae-Ryon (episode 6, 12~26) → Won Jong-Suk (episode 27) → Rim Bok-Hui (episode 28~)
 Oegwipali: Kwon Nyong-Ju (episode 8~26) → Lee Eun-Ju (episode 27)
 Dr. White weasel: Kim Tae-Hong
 Captain Wolf/Captain Keoteo: Unknown (episode 27, 28) → Kim Yong-Chol (episode 31~)
 Assistant Weasel: Kim Tae-Hong (episode 27) → Song Yong-Chol (episode 31~)
 Assistant Fox/Lt. Fox Vixen: Rim Un-Yong
 Field Mouse No. 2: Won Jong-Suk
 Other Actors: Chang Chun-Ha, Choi Soon-Bong, Song Yong-Sook, Kim Jo-Kyung, etc.

Episodes

Controversy
There is speculation among overseas critics that the squirrels and hedgehogs are the North Koreans, the mice are the South Koreans, the bear as the Soviets, the weasels are the Japanese, and the wolves are the Americans, which are argued to coincide with metaphorical interpretations of the country's geopolitical environment. But, this allegorical interpretation is never revealed in the series, and staff at the SEK Studio claimed that this allegorical interpretation is not true. They repeatedly alleged that this animation was created to teach love, friendship, and patriotism to children. However, Choi Sung-guk, a North Korean defector animator who worked at SEK Studio for several years, said that "weasels, mice, and wolves symbolize foreign invaders (imperialists)."

Jajusibo, South Korea's leading far-left and pro-North Korea media outlet, ran a column criticizing Westerners' allegorical interpretations of the show. Citing interviews with SEK staff, they pointed out that such political speculation about the show was "exaggerated by Westerners". One Yanbian Korean-Chinese netizen said, "I have loved this show since I was a child, but I never thought that such an allegorical interpretation exists in the show.".

Meanwhile, Chosun Ilbo, a conservative South Korean media outlet, criticized the show for being very violent, brutal, and blatantly allegorical propaganda.

Merchandise
There are no known official records of merchandise, but brands of toothpaste and backpacks depicting the main characters have been sold in North Korean stores. There are also several statues in children's parks that are located in Pyongyang.

Manhwa
Alongside the television show, a North Korean manhwa was released. There were several key differences between it and the television series, such as the character "Lt. Fox Vixen" originally being depicted as male. It's unknown why this change occurred, but it could be to acknowledge that the United States Armed Forces had allowed women to fight alongside male soldiers.

Reception
The SEK Studio, the North Korean studios that produced this series, has also produced a number of stand-alone short cartoons with funny animal characters. Some of them are part of a large series named the Clever Raccoon Dog. Unlike Squirrel and Hedgehog, they are focused primarily on road safety education, science, sport, summer volunteer work etc.

Mondo dub
The series was released in English and Spanish by Mondo TV, titled Brave Soldier and Soldados Valientes respectively. The series' plot was changed in the dubs, so that subtle references to North Korea or blatant propaganda would end up removed. This translation is often criticized by the show's cult following for having generic voice actors and out of place audio dubbing. The second season was never dubbed due to licensing issues, as Mondo TV only owns the rights to the first selection of episodes.

See also
 North Korean animation
 SEK Studio
 Clever Raccoon Dog
 Boy General

References

1970s North Korean television series
1970s animated television series
1980s North Korean television series
1980s animated television series
1990s North Korean television series
1990s animated television series
2000s North Korean television series
2000s animated television series
2010s North Korean television series
2010s animated television series
1977 North Korean television series debuts
Australian Broadcasting Corporation original programming
North Korean animated television series
Propaganda cartoons
Animated television series about squirrels
Animated television series about hedgehogs
Fictional soldiers